The 2017 Gold Cup was the second season of the Gold Cup competition since its name change, having previously been known as the Community Cup. The competition was the top competition for non-university rugby union clubs in South Africa, Namibia and Zimbabwe.

The 2017 competition retained the same timeslot as the 2016 edition, taking place between 9 September and 29 October 2017.

Competition rules and information

The format of the Gold Cup was the same as the Rugby World Cup. The teams were divided into four pools, each containing five teams. Each team played four pool games, facing all the other teams in their pools once, with two of those matches being home games and two being away games.

The winner and runner-up of each pool entered the play-off stage, which consisted of quarter finals, semi-finals and the final. The winner of each pool met the runner-up of a different pool in a quarter final, at the home venue of the pool winner. The winner of each quarter-final progressed to the semi-finals and the semi-final winners to the final, which was held at the home venue of the finalist with the best record in the pool stages.

Qualification

Defending champions Rustenburg Impala qualified for the 2017 Gold Cup competition. They will be joined by the highest-placed non-university clubs from the club leagues of South Africa's fourteen provincial unions, Limpopo, Namibia and Zimbabwe, plus two wildcard spots.

Teams

The following teams qualified for the 2017 Gold Cup:

Team Listing

External links

References

2017
2017 in South African rugby union
2017 rugby union tournaments for clubs